"Meanwhile Back at the Ranch" is a debut song recorded by American country music band The Clark Family Experience.  It was released in July 2000 as the first single from their self-titled debut album.  The song was written by Wayne Kirkpatrick and Gordon Kennedy.

Critical reception
Deborah Evans Price of Billboard gave the song a favorable review, saying that it "teems with energy and family harmonies that seem more earthy and organic, which is in appealing contrast to other smoothly polished, sometimes saccharine silbing outings."

Chart performance

References

2000 debut singles
The Clark Family Experience songs
Songs written by Wayne Kirkpatrick
Songs written by Gordon Kennedy (musician)
Song recordings produced by Byron Gallimore
Song recordings produced by Tim McGraw
Curb Records singles
2000 songs